ReBoot: Daemon Rising is a 2001 Canadian made-for-TV movie based on the series ReBoot directed by George Samilski. The movie is set after the first three seasons of ReBoot, and along with another ReBoot movie, My Two Bobs, is considered the fourth season. It was originally broadcast in Canada as a film, but was later rebroadcast as 4 individual episodes. Broken down into its component episodes, it is "Daemon Rising", "Cross Nodes", "What's Love Got to Do with It", and "Sacrifice". It was released on DVD along with My Two Bobs.

Plot 
A Super Virus known as Daemon has taken over the Super Computer, and is trying to infect the entire Net. Despite being a virus, she is not malevolent, and only wants to bring order to the Net. To this end, she uses her infection, which the infected call 'The Word', to brainwash everyone she comes into contact with. She has already infected all of the Guardian Collective, apart from Bob and Matrix. The Guardians' key tools, which allowed them to open portals to sealed-off systems, left the Guardians when Daemon infected them. Because Bob merged with his key tool, he is the only Guardian who can still create portals, so Daemon makes multiple attempts to capture and infect him.

In the first part of the movie, an army of infected Guardians invade Mainframe. Hexadecimal, now loyal to Bob, helps him remove them from Mainframe without deleting them. In doing so, she uses up so much power that she is reformatted into a Sprite, and becomes enveloped in a null cocoon which the Matrix siblings recognize as their father Welman. In a series of flashbacks, Hex reveals that when Welman activated his Gateway command shortly before Bob arrived on Mainframe, it brought the Super Virus Gigabyte to Mainframe's Twin City. This caused an explosion which nullified Mainframe's Twin City and everyone in it, including Welman, and split Gigabyte into Megabyte and Hexadecimal. Dot convinces Hex to make Welman a new body out of Nulls, then convinces Welman to rebuild his Gateway command.

Mouse, Dot, and Phong manage to seal off a few systems on the Net, and when Daemon activates her infection, which has been lying dormant, all systems besides those become infected. During the course of the battle, Mike the TV, AndrAIa, Matrix, and Mouse become infected, and therefore loyal to Daemon. Since it was Mouse who programmed the firewalls that sealed off systems like Mainframe, Daemon uses Mouse to break into Mainframe, as she needs Bob to help her infect the other sealed-off systems.

After Daemon arrives in Mainframe and infects Bob, she forces him to create portals to those systems, which is slowly killing him. By absorbing the energies of Mainframe's core, Hexadecimal powers back up into a virus again, and uses the energy to fight Daemon. However, her attempts are in vain: Daemon is a Cron virus, and her time has come, so she decompiles herself to initiate the final stage of her infection. This causes everyone she infected to begin a Net-wide binary countdown. When it reaches zero, all the infected will be deleted, and so will the Net. After infecting Little Enzo's icon, Hexadecimal takes a cure to Daemon's infection from Matrix's icon and delivers it to the entire Net using the Gateway command. In essence, Hexadecimal sacrificed herself to cure the entire Net from Daemon's infection.

At the end of the movie, Bob and Dot get engaged. However, a few seconds later, a portal opens, and Ray Tracer and another Bob step through it, leading to confusion.

Cast 
 Kathleen Barr: Dot Matrix / System
 Ian James Corlett: Bob / Austin Powers User
 Garry Chalk: Slash / Turbo
 Michael Donovan: Mike the TV / Phong 
 Giacomo Baessato: Enzo Matrix 
 Scott McNeil: Hack / Specky
 Shirley Millner: Hexadecimal
 Sharon Alexander: AndrAIa
 Michael Benyaer: Young Bob
 Colombe Demers: Daemon
 Stevie Vallance: Mouse
 Dale Wilson: Welman Matrix
 Richard Newman: Daecon

References

External links 
 

2001 television films
Canadian animated television films
2001 computer-animated films
ReBoot
Films about computing
Works set in computers
Cyberpunk films
Rainmaker Studios films
Films based on television series
Television films based on television series
2001 films
2000s Canadian films